Valek or Válek is a surname. Notable people with the surname include:

Erika Valek (born 1982), Colombian basketball player
Jim Valek (1928–2005), American football player and coach
Miroslav Válek (1927–1991), Slovak poet, publicist and politician
Vladimír Válek (born 1935), Czech conductor
Zdeněk Válek (born 1958), Czech footballer

See also
Valek Airport, an airport in Russia